Attorney General Anderson may refer to:

John Anderson Jr. (1917–2014), Attorney General of Kansas
William Alexander Anderson (1842–1930), Attorney General of Virginia
Forrest H. Anderson (1913–1989), Attorney General of Montana
James Hodson Anderson (1909–1996), Attorney General of Nebraska
James R. Anderson (1864–1913), Attorney General of South Australia
Sigurd Anderson (1904–1990), Attorney General of South Dakota

See also
Andrea Anderson-Mason (fl. 2010s), Attorney General of New Brunswick
Elizabeth Barrett-Anderson (born 1953), Attorney General of Guam
Maxwell Hendry Maxwell-Anderson (1879–1951),  Attorney General of Gibraltar
General Anderson (disambiguation)